St. John Hospital (SJH), is a community hospital at Cheung Chau, Hong Kong, provides primary, emergency and community health services to the community at Cheung Chau.

History
St. John’s Hospital was founded by the St. John Ambulance Association. The foundation stone of this Victorian-style construction was laid by the tycoon brothers Mr Aw Boon Haw and Mr Aw Boon Par in 1932. In November 1934, it was donated to the Hong Kong St. John Ambulance Association, and officially called St John Ambulance Association Haw Par Hospital after the names of the donors. In 1946, it was converted to a tuberculosis sanatorium. On 22 January 2010, it was confirmed as a Grade 3 historic building.

Facilities
As at March 2013, the hospital has 87 beds and 113 full-time equivalent staff.

The hospital provides services for about 12,000 residents of Cheung Chau. Those services include:
24-Hour Accident and Emergency Service
Specialties
Medicine
Chest
Maternal and Child Health
Family Planning
Others
Methadone Detoxification Clinic
Physiotherapy
X-ray
Occupational Therapy
Chaplaincy
Dietetic
Courtesy Transportation for Selected Patients

References

External links

 St. John Hospital - Hong Kong Hospital Authority

Hospitals in Hong Kong
Cheung Chau
Grade III historic buildings in Hong Kong
1934 establishments in Hong Kong